The Ambassador of the United Kingdom to Cuba is the United Kingdom's foremost diplomatic representative in the Republic of Cuba, and head of the UK's diplomatic mission in Cuba. His or her official title is His Britannic Majesty's Ambassador to the Republic of Cuba.

List of heads of mission

Consul-General in the Island of Cuba
1892–1898: Sir Alexander Gollan
1898–1902: Lionel Carden

Minister Resident to the Republic of Cuba
1902–1906: Lionel Carden
1906–1909: Arthur Grant Duff
1909–1912: Stephen Leech

Envoy Extraordinary and Minister Plenipotentiary to the Republic of Cuba
1912–1919: Stephen Leech (also to Haiti and Dominican Republic from 1913)
1919–1921: William Erskine

Chargé d'Affaires in Cuba
1921–1924: Godfrey Haggard
1924–1925: Thomas Morris

Envoy Extraordinary and Minister Plenipotentiary to the Republic of Cuba
1925–1931: Thomas Morris
1931–1933: Sir John Broderick
1933–1935: Herbert Grant Watson
1935–1937: Thomas Maitland Snow
1937–1940: Herbert Grant Watson
1940–1944: Sir George Ogilvie-Forbes
1944–1949: James Leishman Dodds
1949–1950: Adrian Holman

Ambassador Extraordinary and Plenipotentiary to the Republic of Cuba
1950–1954: Adrian Holman
1954–1956: Wilfred Hansford Gallienne
1956–1960: Stanley Fordham
1960–1963: Herbert Stanley Marchant
1963–1966: Adam Watson
1966–1970: Richard Slater
1970–1972: Richard Sykes
1972–1975: Stanley Fingland
1975–1979: Edward Jackson
1979–1981: John Ure
1981–1984: David Churchill Thomas
1984–1986: Robin Fearn
1986–1989: Andrew Palmer
1989–1991: David Brighty
1991–1994: Leycester Coltman
1994–1998: Philip Alexander McLean
1998–2001: David Ridgway
2001–2004: Paul Webster Hare
2004–2008: John Dew
2008–2012: Dianna Melrose
2012–2016: Tim Cole

2016–2022: Antony Stokes
2022–present: Sir George Hollingbery

References

External links

Cuba
 
United Kingdom